Out in Science, Technology, Engineering, and Mathematics, Inc., abbreviated oSTEM, is a 501(c)(3) non-profit professional society dedicated to LGBTQ+ individuals within the science, technology, engineering, and mathematics (STEM) community.

History

In October 2005, IBM sponsored a focus group where students from across the United States convened at the Human Rights Campaign headquarters in Washington, D.C. These students discussed topics relevant to LGBTQ+ communities at their colleges and universities, and they debated how to structure an organization that serves students in science, technology, engineering, and mathematics.

Founded in 2009 and achieving 501(c)(3) status in 2010, oSTEM currently consists of more than 100 chapters across the United States and the United Kingdom.

Mission
oSTEM strives to identify, address, and advocate for the needs of LGBTQ+ students and professionals within the STEM fields. oSTEM fulfills these needs by providing networking opportunities, mentorship connections, strategic collaborations, and professional/leadership development, as well as an annual global conference.

Activities

Conferences
oSTEM hosts annual conferences that discuss LGBTQ+ topics in STEM as well as intelligence fields. Topics discussed include inclusion, outreach, and diversity within the workplace. The goal of workshops, talks, and networking events for LGBTQ+ people is to help them integrate and move up in their fields. The fourth annual conference was hosted jointly with the National Organization of Gay and Lesbian Scientists and Technical Professionals' Out to Innovate in Atlanta in 2014.

LGBT STEM Day
On July 5th, 2018, oSTEM along with Pride in STEM, House of STEM, and InterEngineering created international awareness for LGBTQ+ people in Science, Technology, Engineering, and Math.

Awards
oSTEM presents a variety of awards annually to individuals and organizations that demonstrate a strong dedication to advancing and empowering LGBTQ+ in STEM fields.

oSTEM Global STEM Service Award

The oSTEM Global STEM Service Award is given to present and past oSTEM members who show strong dedication to inclusion, diversity, and equality for LGBTQ+ and other marginalized individuals in STEM fields.

Awardees are: 
Dr. Eric Patridge (2013)
Dr. Elena Long (2014)
Emily Li (2015)
Marjorie Willner (2016)
Elise Wantling (2017)
Aaron F. Mertz (2018)
Avery Cunningham (2019)
Cel Welsh (2020)

oSTEM Strategic Alliance Award

The oSTEM Strategic Alliance Award is presented to a current sponsoring organization, community partner, or grant provider of oSTEM who demonstrates strong dedication, engagement, and support to oSTEM and its values.

Awardees are:
Alcoa (2015)
US Intelligence Community (IC Pride) (2016)
Accenture (2017)
Boeing (2018)
Ford Motor Company (2019)

oSTEM Partner Excellence Award

The oSTEM Partner Excellence Award is presented to individuals associated with oSTEM accomplished in their much academic or professional lives who reguland arly advocate for the full inclusion of people of all marginalized identities.

Awardees are: 
Gib Murray - Raytheon (2015)
Wolfgang Sigmund - University of Florida (2016)
Steve Riley - NASA (2017)
Lianna Newman - ConsenSys/Out in Tech (2018)
Beau Williams - Boeing (2019)

Overall Student Chapter of the Year

The Overall Student Chapter of the Year is given to oSTEM chapters that educate, empower, and engage a diverse community. These chapters contrihelp a lot with finding LGBTQ students in the STEM community, helping them, and speaking up for themrdees are:
oSTEM at University of Kansas (2016)
oSTEM at New York University (2017)
oSTEM at Colorado School of Mines (2018)
oSTEM at UC San Diego (2019)

Rookie Student Chapter of the Year

The Rookie Student Chapter of the Year celebrates achievements by oSTEM chapters that have been founded within two years of application submission.

Awardees are:
oSTEM at University of Michigan (2016)
oSTEM at University of Minnesota (2017)
oSTEM at University of Arkansas (2018)
oSTEM at Howard University (2019)

Chapters
There are over 100 chapters in the SYSTEM. Chapters are organized into six geographic regions (A–F) and two types (student and professional).

Student Chapters

The six regions are:
Region A
Maine, New Hampshire, Vermont, Massachusetts, Rhode Island, Connecticut, New York, New Jersey, Pennsylvania, United Kingdom
Region B
Michigan, Indiana, Ohio, Kentucky, West Virginia, Virginia, Maryland, Delaware
Region C
Florida, Georgia, Alabama, Mississippi, Louisiana, Arkansas, Tennessee, South Carolina, North Carolina
Region D
North Dakota, South Dakota, Nebraska, Kansas, Minnesota, Iowa, Missouri, Illinois, Wisconsin
Region E
Utah, Colorado, Arizona, New Mexico, Oklahoma, Texas
Region F
Washington, Alaska, Hawai'i, California, Oregon, Nevada, Idaho, Wyoming, Montana

Professional Chapters
The first professional chapter is currently being tested in the Boston metropolitan area. In 2020, there was a shift to a virtual professional chapter with members in the United States and United Kingdom, with a number of smaller in-person events occurring in those two regions.

See also

List of LGBT-related organizations and conferences
List of LGBT events

References

External links
Shawn Wasserman, "National Conference Discusses Being Out in STEM" 11/10/2014
Hal Marz, University Programs, "oSTEM 2013 at the Google NYC Office" 2/6/2014
Camille Crittenden, Contributor, "Tech Pride: Celebrations and Challenges for LGBT Members of the Tech Community" 6/19/2017
Sarah Scoles, Science, "HOW QUEER SCIENTISTS ARE SHAPING THEIR FUTURE WITH A SURVEY" 7/26/16
Han Wang, Staff Writer, "For All the QT’s in Science" 4/17/2017
Barbara Moran, "LGBTQ+ issues in STEM diversity" 6/15/2017
Tatiana Zhelezniakova, "A Look at oSTEM: Out as LGBT+ in Science, Technology, Engineering and Mathematics" 12/10/2016
oSTEM Official site

LGBT organizations in the United States
LGBT student organizations
LGBT charities
Non-profit organizations based in the United States
501(c)(3) organizations
Science education
Engineering education
Mathematics education
Technology education
Scientific organizations established in 2009
2009 establishments in the United States
Organizations for LGBT science